Metopta is a monotypic moth genus of the family Erebidae erected by Charles Swinhoe in 1900. Its only species, Metopta rectifasciata, was first described by Édouard Ménétries in 1863. It is found in Korea and Japan.

References

Catocalinae
Monotypic moth genera